"Yes, I'm Ready" a song by Barbara Mason from her album Yes, I'm Ready (1965). It has been covered by numerous artists, and was a hit single for Teri DeSario and K.C. when they recorded a duet version in 1980.

Barbara Mason
Mason, a soul / R&B singer from Philadelphia, Pennsylvania, had released a few singles while she was a teenager in the mid-1960s. "Yes, I'm Ready" became Mason's first big hit on the music charts, peaking at #2 on the Billboard R&B chart, and No. 5 on the Billboard Hot 100 chart in the summer of 1965. While Mason would continue recording into the 1980s, this song has been her highest-charting hit. Mason later re-recorded the song for her 1973 album, Give Me Your Love. The key personnel who helped bring this hit recording to life later became the important creators of the "Philly Sound". These people include: Kenny Gamble as a backup singer, Bobby Eli and Norman Harris on guitar, Ronnie Baker on bass and Earl Young on drums (Eli, Harris and Baker later on became principal members of MFSB and Kenny Gamble would co-found Philadelphia International Records with Leon Huff).

Teri DeSario
DeSario, a vocalist from Miami, Florida, was a high school classmate of Harry Wayne Casey, best known as the lead vocalist and songwriter for KC and the Sunshine Band. Casey liked the original recording and wanted to record a cover version of the song, and he was producing DeSario's second studio album, Moonlight Madness, for Casablanca Records. Neil Bogart, president of the record label, had an idea to record the song as a duet, and it was the first single released from the album in late 1979. Their version of the song spent two weeks at No. 2 on the Billboard Hot 100 chart in March 1980, kept from the summit by "Crazy Little Thing Called Love" by the rock group Queen. It also spent two weeks at No. 1 on the Billboard adult contemporary chart and reached No. 20 on the Billboard R&B chart, earning Gold Record certification from the RIAA.

Chart performance

Weekly charts
Barbara Mason

Year-end charts

Tom Sullivan

Teri DeSario with K.C.

Other versions
"Yes, I'm Ready" has been covered by other artists, including Mona Carita (fi) (as "Tahdon"), Shirley Ellis, Gladys Knight and the Pips, Maureen McGovern, Jeffrey Osborne, and Carla Thomas. It was recorded as a duet by the artist Jed and American singer La Toya Jackson. This single was released only in 7" format in Japan, where it failed to chart. It was not included on any of Jackson's albums and includes the instrumental version on the B-side. In 1997, teenage singing sensation Kimberly Scott, mostly known for her hit "Tuck Me In", remade this song with Taiwanese musician Harlem Yu, which was included in Harlem Yu's 1997 English cover album "Harlem Music Channel".

Chicago's hit "Beginnings" ("Live at Tanglewood" version) includes the line "I don't even know how to hold your hand" from "Yes, I'm Ready".

Barbara Mason's original 1965 recording was sampled by Phantogram for their 2013 hit single "Fall In Love."

See also
List of number-one adult contemporary singles of 1980 (U.S.)

References

External links
Mason release info at discogs.com
DeSario release info at discogs.com
Music Video of Harlem Yu and Kimberly Scott's version

1965 songs
1965 singles
1976 singles
1979 singles
La Toya Jackson songs
Teri DeSario songs
Barbara Mason songs
KC and the Sunshine Band songs
Casablanca Records singles
Pop ballads
Rhythm and blues ballads
Male–female vocal duets